Andrée Debar (5 May 1920 – 24 January 1999) was a French actress and producer of stage and screen. She was married to the right-wing French politician and film producer Roger Duchet.

Selected filmography
 Judgement of God (1952)
 The Seven Deadly Sins (1952)
 The Merchant of Venice (1953)
 The King's Prisoner (1954)
 House on the Waterfront (1955)
 Guilty (1956)
 Girl and the River (1958)
 Le secret du Chevalier d'Éon (1959)
 Croesus (1960)
 A King Without Distraction (1963)

References

Bibliography
 Hayward, Susan. French Costume Drama of the 1950s: Fashioning Politics in Film''. Intellect Books, 2010.

External links

1920 births
1999 deaths
French film actresses
French stage actresses
French film producers
20th-century French women